Charles Greenway (1862 – 19 March 1949) was an English cricketer. He played for Gloucestershire between 1890 and 1891.

References

1862 births
1949 deaths
English cricketers
Gloucestershire cricketers
Place of birth missing